Mes Repères is a 2009 album recorded by French rapper La Fouine. It was his third studio album and was released in France, Wallonia (and Brussels) and Romandy in February 2009.

Track listing
 1. Du Ferme - 3:59
    2. Immortelles - 4:38
    3. Tous Les Mêmes - 4:20
    4. Rap Français - 3:53
    5. Ca Fait Mal - 4:30
    6. On Fait L'Taf - 4:44
    7. Interlude En Studio - 1:40
    8. De L'Or - 3:25
    9. Repartir A Zéro avec Soprano - 4:23
   10. Interlude Salam - 0:50
   11. Afrika - 3:22
   12. Moi Hamdoulah Ça Va avec Canardo - 4:35
   13. Rap Inconscient - 5:02
   14. Chips - 3:18
   15. Mes Repères - 3:48
   16. Je Sais Où Ça Ramène - 3:10
   17. La Mémoire Dans La Peau - 5:10
   18. Feu Rouge - 4:26
   19. Ça Fait Mal (Remix) avec Sefyu et Soprano - 4:32

Charts

Weekly charts

Year-end charts

References

2009 albums